The world's most valuable sports teams, as ranked annually by the American magazine Forbes, include teams from association football, American football, baseball, and basketball.

In 2016, the National Football League (NFL)'s Dallas Cowboys simultaneously became both the first team to surpass $4 billion in value and the first non–association football team to top the ranking since its inception in 2010. Manchester United (2010–12) and Real Madrid (2013–15) have previously each been named the most valuable team three times.

Current ranking 

Source:

Number one by year

Previous rankings

2020

Source

2019 

Source

2018 

Source

2017 

Source

2016 

Source

2015

Source

2014

Source

2013

Source

2012

Source

2011

Source

2010

Source

See also

 Forbes' list of the most valuable association football clubs
 Forbes' list of the most valuable NFL clubs
 Forbes' list of the most valuable NBA clubs
 Forbes' list of the most valuable MLB clubs
 Forbes' list of the most valuable NHL clubs
Major professional sports leagues in the United States and Canada#Franchise valuations

References

Forbes lists
21st century-related lists
Lists of sports teams
Sports rankings
Teams